Giuseppe Resnati (born 26 August 1955) is an Italian chemist with interests in supramolecular chemistry and fluorine chemistry. He has a particular focus on self-assembly processes driven by halogen bonds and chalcogen bonds.

Education and professional positions
Resnati was born in Monza, Italy. He obtained his PhD in Industrial Chemistry at the University of Milan in 1988 with Prof. Carlo Scolastico and a thesis on asymmetric synthesis via chiral sulfoxides. After a period of activity at the Italian National Research Council, in 2001 he became professor of chemistry for materials at the Politecnico di Milano.

Research interests
His research interests cover/have covered the following topics:
 enantioselective synthesis of mono- and polyfluorinated compounds and synthesis via perfluorinated reagents (perfluorinated oxaziridines as powerful yet selective oxidizing agents)
 fluorinated contrast agents for magnetic resonance imaging
 intermolecular forces and their use in crystal engineering; supramolecular chemistry, Borromean rings, and self-assembly processes in the design and preparation of functional materials
 halogen bond and iodine chemistry; chalcogen bond.
 green chemistry

Honors and awards
 van der Waals Prize 2021 (awarded in 2022 by the 2nd International Conference on Noncovalent Interactions, ICNI-2022)<ref>{{Cite web |url=https://icni2021.unistra.fr/van-der-waals-prize/|title=ICNI-2022, The van der Waals Prize}}</ref> 
 RSC-SCI Award Lectureship in the Chemical Sciences (awarded in 2010 by Royal Society of Chemistry/Società Chimica Italiana)
 Intermolecular Interactions and Structural Aspects in Organic Chemistry Award (awarded in 2008 by Società Chimica Italiana)
 Corrado Fuortes award (awarded in 1986 by Istituto Lombardo Accademia di Scienze e Lettere)
 Member of the Academia Europaea (since 2012)
 Member of the International Advisory Board of the Journal of Fluorine Chemistry (Elsevier, 2001 onwards); of Crystals (MDPI, 2015 onwards); of Sustainable Chemistry & Pharmacy (Elsevier, 2017-2019)
 Topic Editor of Crystal Growth & Design'' (ACS) (2012 onwards)
 Member of the International Steering Committee of the: -International Conference on Noncovalent Intereactions (ICNI) from ICNI-1 (Lisbon, Portugal; 2019) onwards; -International Symposium on Fluorine Chemistry (ISFC) from ISFC-15 (Vancouver, Canada; 1997) onwards; -International Meeting on Halogen Chemistry (HalChem) from Halchem-V (Cagliari, Italy; 2010) onwards; -European Symposium on Fluorine Chemistry (ESFC) from ESFC-11 (Bled, Slovenia; 1995) to ESFC-19 (Warsaw, Poland; 2019)
 Chair of the: -21st International Symposium on Fluorine Chemistry (23-28 August 2015, Como, Italy); -1st International Symposium on Halogen Bonding (ISXB-1)(18-22 June 2014, Porto Cesareo, Lecce, Italy)
 Member of the National Organizing Committee of the 6th International IUPAC Conference on Green Chemistry (4-8 September 2016, Venice, Italy); member of the International Scientific Committee of the 2nd Green & Sustainable Chemistry Conference, 14–17 May 2017, Berlin, Germany; member of the Committee of the Faraday Discussion "Halogen Bonding in Supramolecular and Solid State Chemistry", 10–12 July 2017, Ottawa, Canada
 Coordinator of the UNESCO UNITWIN Network “GREENOMIcS - Green Chemistry Excellence from the Baltic See to the Mediterranean See and Beyond” (2017 onwards)
 Advisor of District 2050 Governor for starting Rotary Club Morimondo Abbazia (2012), Club charter member (2013) and president (2015–16)
 Knight of Magistral Grace of the Sovereign Military Order of Malta (2022); Knight Commander of the Equestrian Order of the Holy Sepulchre of Jerusalem (2020); Knight of Merit with Star of the Sacred Military Constantinian Order of Saint George (SMOCSG) (2020).

References

1955 births
People from Monza
Living people
University of Milan alumni
Members of Academia Europaea
Members of the European Academy of Sciences and Arts
20th-century chemists
21st-century chemists
Italian chemists
Organic chemists
Academic staff of the Polytechnic University of Milan
Knights of Malta
Knights of the Holy Sepulchre
National Research Council (Italy) people